Marche is a station on Line 5 of the Milan Metro.

History 
The works for the construction of the first section of Line 5, which includes Marche station, began in September 2007, and it was opened on 10 February 2013.

Station structure 
Marche is an underground station with two tracks in one tunnel and, like all the other stations on Line 5, is wheelchair accessible.

It is located at the intersection of Viale Zara and Viale Marche, but has exits only to Viale Zara.

Interchanges 
Tram lines 5 and 7 stop near the station.

References 

Line 5 (Milan Metro) stations
Railway stations opened in 2013
2013 establishments in Italy
Railway stations in Italy opened in the 21st century